From the Very Depths is the fourteenth studio album by English heavy metal band Venom. It was released by Spinefarm on 27 January 2015.

Track listing

Credits
Cronos – bass, lead vocals
La Rage – guitars, backing vocals
Dante – drums, backing vocals

Charts

References

2015 albums
Venom (band) albums
Spinefarm Records albums